Tunneller or Tunneler may refer to:
 A worker in a tunnel
 A surgical device
 Tunnel boring machine
 Tunneler, demonic puppet in List of Puppet Master characters